Amanat is a 1955 Bollywood film directed by Arvind Sen and produced by Bimal Roy starring Bharat Bhushan, Chand Usmani, Pran in lead roles.

Plot
A dying man entrusts his life savings to Purshotam, a stranger he just met, and asks him to promise to take this money to his wife, and son Pradeep, in a remote village in India.

Cast
 Bharat Bhushan as Pradeep
 Chand Usmani as Meena
 Pran as Naresh
 Nazir Hussain as Purushottam
 Kanhaiyalal as Laxmidas
 Asit Sen as Ganesh
 Achala Sachdev as Pradeep's Mother

Music

Reception
The film earned a high rating (7.4) at the IMDb.

External links

1955 films
1950s Hindi-language films
Films scored by Salil Chowdhury
Indian drama films
Indian black-and-white films
1955 drama films